Ted Frost (April 6, 1932 – November 6, 2018) was an American rower. He competed in the men's coxless pair event at the 1960 Summer Olympics.

References

External links
 

1932 births
2018 deaths
American male rowers
Olympic rowers of the United States
Rowers at the 1960 Summer Olympics
Rowers from Seattle
Pan American Games medalists in rowing
Pan American Games gold medalists for the United States
Rowers at the 1959 Pan American Games